Charles Wesley Flint was an American bishop in the Methodist Church, elected in 1936.

Prior to his election to the episcopacy, he was involved in educational work.  He was the president of Cornell College in Iowa (1915–22), then was the fifth chancellor of Syracuse University from 1922 until his election as a bishop. During his time as chancellor, he served as an advisor to the Alpha Phi Omega chapter at Syracuse University.

See also
List of bishops of the United Methodist Church

External links
https://web.archive.org/web/20060222055724/http://www.cornellcollege.edu/150/timeline.shtml%23
https://web.archive.org/web/20080917074745/http://www.syr.edu/aboutsu/chronology/1906.html

Year of birth missing
Year of death missing
American Methodist bishops
Presidents of Syracuse University
Bishops of The Methodist Church (USA)
20th-century Methodist bishops